Kurt A. Körber (September 7, 1909 – August 10, 1992) was a German founder and businessman, who founded a group of companies including the Hauni Maschinenbau AG, an internationally leading company for the production of machines for the tobacco industry.  The sole shareholder of the companies is the Körber Foundation, initiated in 1959 by Körber. Until his death in 1992, Körber was the sole owner of the Körber AG.

He was born in Berlin and died in Hamburg.

References

1909 births
1992 deaths
Businesspeople from Berlin
Nazi Party members
People from Bergedorf